Tumanyan Park is a public park in the Ajapnyak district of Yerevan, Armenia. It is located on Halabyan Street in the gorge of Hrazdan River, between the Great Bridge of Hrazdan and the Tumo Center for Creative Technologies. It was opened in 1970 and occupies an area of 7 hectares on the right bank of Hrazdan River. It was opened and named after the famous writer and poet Hovhannes Tumanyan on the 100th anniversary of his birth.

In 1973, the statues of the two main characters of Tumanyan's Anoush opera; Anoush and Saro were erected in the park.

In 1986, another statue of Tumanyan's fictional character Loretsi Sako was erected in the park.

Tumanyan Park is among the attractive playgrounds for the children of Yerevan.

Gallery

References

Parks in Yerevan
Buildings and structures completed in 1970
Urban public parks
Hovhannes Tumanyan